The Bryan Ferry Orchestra is a retro-jazz ensemble founded and led by Bryan Ferry. They exclusively play his work in a 1920s jazz style. Ferry formed the orchestra out of a desire to focus on the melodies of his songs, and "see how they would stand up without singing".  Their album, The Jazz Age, was released on 26 November 2012 as a 10in vinyl folio edition and on 12in vinyl, CD and digital download, on BMG Rights Management  Ferry neither plays nor sings with the orchestra; BBC reviewer Chris Roberts called it a "peculiar concept then, with Ferry now, almost Warhol-like, sagely mute to one side while collaborators silkscreen his own icons. As fascinating as it is perplexing, anything but obvious, and therefore to be applauded."

Personnel

Performance

 Colin Good - Piano & Arrangements
 Enrico Tomasso - Cornet & Trumpet
 Malcolm Earle-Smith - Trombone
 Richard White - Alto & Bass Saxophones, Clarinet & Bass Clarinet
 Robert Fowler - Tenor Saxophone & Clarinet
 Alan Barnes - Alto & Baritone Saxophones, Saxinet
 Martin Wheatley - Banjo & Guitar
 John Sutton - Drums

Discography
The Jazz Age (26 November 2012)
Music from Baz Luhrmann's Film The Great Gatsby (6 May 2013)
"Love Is the Drug" (with Bryan Ferry)
"Crazy in Love" (with Emeli Sandé)
A Selection of Yellow Cocktail Music from Baz Luhrmann's Film The Great Gatsby (The Great Gatsby Jazz Recordings) (10 May 2013)
Babylon Berlin (Music from the Original TV Series) (2017)
"Dance Away"
"Reason or Rhyme"
"Bitters End"
"Alphaville"
"Chance Meeting"

References

External links
 Official Bryan Ferry website

British jazz ensembles
Musical groups established in 2012
Bryan Ferry
2012 establishments in the United Kingdom